The 1900 Tennessee gubernatorial election was held on November 6, 1900. Incumbent Democrat Benton McMillin defeated Republican nominee John E. McCall with 53.86% of the vote.

General election

Candidates
Major party candidates
Benton McMillin, Democratic
John E. McCall, Republican 

Other candidates
R. S. Cheves, Prohibition
H. J. Mullens, People's
Charles H. Stockwell, Social Democratic

Results

References

1900
Tennessee
Gubernatorial